Nanyang is the Chinese term for the warmer and fertile geographical region along the southern coastal regions of China and beyond, otherwise known as the 'South Sea' or Southeast Asia. The term came into common usage in self-reference to the large ethnic Chinese migrant population in Southeast Asia, and is contrasted with Xiyang, which refers to the Western world, Dongyang, which refers to East Asian cultural sphere and occasionally including the Greater India, and Beiyang, which refers to Russia. The Chinese press regularly uses the term to refer to the region stretching from Yunnan Province to Singapore (north to south) and from Myanmar (Burma) to Vietnam (west to east); in addition, the term also refers to Brunei, East Malaysia, East Timor, Indonesia and the Philippines in the region it encompasses.

The alternative term, "Great Golden Peninsula", came into common usage due to the large number of Chinese migrants – attempting to escape the reach of the oppressive Manchu Emperors – it received.  The Chinese, especially those from the southeastern seaboard, also ventured to the region to engage in trade. The Nanyang was extremely important in the trading business and one of China's main trading partners in early years; it encompassed three main trading routes: one through Myanmar (Burma), one through Vietnam and lastly one through Laos.

Historical significance 

Waves of Chinese emigration from mainland China, also referred to as the Chinese diaspora, to The Great Golden Peninsula and other regions have occurred several times through the course of history. The first wave of emigration came as a result of the fall of the Ming dynasty in 1644, the ruling dynasty in China that followed the collapse of the Yuan dynasty and ruled for 276 years. The migrants opposed the Manchu seizure of power in Beijing and migrated to establish overseas Chinese communities throughout the Nanyang region. This led to Chinese control of large parts of the region's economy and means of production.

The second wave started as a form of escaping the oppressive control exerted by the Manchu Emperors of the Qing dynasty, the last imperial dynasty of China ruling from 1644 to 1911. After the Taiping Rebellion and alternative upheavals that resulted in the disintegration of China, warlords ruptured the country into lawless fiefdoms, leading to an expansion of the Chinese communities in the Nanyang.

The Mekong River, gathering its strength in the Yunnan province and flowing south into the Nanyang nations of Burma, Laos, Thailand, Cambodia and Vietnam before spilling into the South China Sea, was an extremely important facilitator of the Chinese Diaspora. It became known, not as a nourishing and life-giving river, but as the leading channel out of China for illegal migrants.

More recently, the third wave of migrants to the Nanyang – coming from all over China – has led to, arguably, more profound economic and social impacts than waves in the past. Better overland routes and air travel, along with the more relaxed Chinese emigration regulations of 1979 and China's economic reform and opening up of its economy in 1980, have facilitated the process of migration and led the Chinese into a search for business opportunities in the Great Golden Peninsula.

Economic development 
The Great Golden Peninsula has benefitted greatly from Chinese immigration. Economic opportunity, commerce in particular, brought the Chinese to the Nanyang, and involvement in commercial activities is a common characteristic amongst Chinese minorities in the region. These Chinese family businesses and the Chinese population of the Nanyang can be characterized as the driving force behind economic growth and capitalism of the region.

Since the period after 1850, the Chinese have come to dominate small business in the major cities of the Nanyang. They tended not only to own the shops, but hire mostly Chinese workers, increasing the scope and power of the Chinese influence. These business are distinguished by high level of centralization, most of the decision-making relies on the owner-manager; absence of bureaucratic regulation, yielding a fluid organizational structure; an autocratic and paternalistic leadership style; existence of preferential treatment combined with extensive family ties of obligation of duty; and finally, a customized network of external links. These features set them apart from other businesses in the Nanyang and allowed them to thrive due to the entrepreneurial talent they demonstrated.

Because the business industry for the Nanyang-Chinese seemed extremely prosperous, most of the Chinese immigrants strove to acquaint themselves with the shopkeepers and attempted to learn and eventually master trade in the hopes that they too would eventually gain entry to business in the Nanyang. This allowed for the continuation of business-creation by the Chinese arriving in the region.

The overseas Chinese of the Great Golden Peninsula play extremely significant roles in the region; in particular, involved with trade and commerce, mining and commercial agriculture.  One of the main benefits the Chinese merchants brought to the Nanyang region is a more prominent relationship with the United States and other Pacific countries due to the strong link these merchants foster with foreign countries. The Nanyang Chinese continue to be vibrant elements in their newfound homes.

Despite pogroms and discrimination against the Chinese in the Nanyang, especially where they constituted the minorities, the region still remains economically attractive to them. Pockets of settled Chinese communities continue to testify to the attractiveness of the Great Golden Peninsula.

Although China has positive impacts in the Nanyang region, in more recent years (since the early 1980s), China's continuous success with its open-door policy and export-oriented development strategy has started to cast a shadow on economies of the Great Golden Peninsula that must compete with China in attracting Foreign Direct Investment (FDI) and in manufactured products to the same markets.

Trade routes 

China's chief interest in the region of the Great Golden Peninsula was the expansion of its economic activities, namely trade. Foreign trade has been a very significant factor in maintaining stability and in contributing to growth in China. Chinese merchants were constantly pushing south as trade with Burma thrived. The Chinese province of Yunnan – where the Mekong River, previously used for illegal migration, flows - is China's main avenue for trade with the Nanyang. Yunnan is a landlocked province that possesses a well-developed industrial base with cheap labor and a fast-growing economy. Its proximity to the Nanyang region has been complemented by its remoteness from Beijing's control – the region was the last stronghold of anti-communist forces. It has for years sought a foreign market for its goods and an outlet to sea; due to the ideal conditions described above and its easy access to the Mekong River, it has begun gaining access to the several markets of the Nanyang, particularly Burma and Laos.

Another main avenue for Chinese trade with the Great Golden Peninsula is the South China Sea; it was the main route for trade in commodities and ideas, and even named the second Silk Route. Trade flows between China and the Nanyang were characterized by exports of manufactured or processed goods from China and exports of raw materials and food – particularly rice – from the Nanyang.

More recently, Singapore developed into the center of trade between the two regions; it became the base for Chinese activity in the Nanyang. Singapore was not only a main source of capital for overseas Chinese in the Nanyang but it also handled Chinese human cargo by ‘sorting’ it according to their skills and sturdiness.

Social impact 
The Nanyang region has been in the Chinese cultural sphere of influence for an extended period of time. Therefore, the rise in the role and influence of the ethnic Chinese is extremely important for the understanding of the region. The Chinese philosophy, religion, political philosophies, governmental standards and overall way of life have been transferred to the Great Golden Peninsula.

One of the many examples of China's influence over the region is the Chinese Lunar New Year, commonly referred to as “Chinese New Year”. It is celebrated and is an official public holiday in many countries of the Nanyang region (Vietnam, Singapore, Brunei, Malaysia, Indonesia and Philippines). Another prominent example is the original roots of the people in the region; a significant portion of the population of the Nanyang region originated in China, especially when it comes to Thailand, Laos, Vietnam and Singapore.

More specifically, Chinese influence in Thailand is seen in a rise in Thai-Chinese power, not only in commerce and business but also in politics, bureaucracy and intelligentsia. In Indonesia, some news bulletins are in Mandarin, whilst in Singapore, one of the four official languages is Mandarin. Vietnam has been following the 'China model' politically and economically; like in China, Vietnamese from overseas have led and been the most significant contributors of the economic recovery of the country. Malaysia experiences Chinese cultural influence through Chinese tycoons; they play a prominent role in leading the economic boom and inspire reforms to Malaysia's Malay supremacy policy.

The anti-Chinese sentiment of the Nanyang has subsided in recent years as Chinese influence results in prosperous rather than communist results. This has generated amongst many Nanyang-Chinese the will to rediscover their cultural identity in line with the emerging China of the north. One of the impacts of this rediscovery in the Nanyang region, is a boom in Mandarin Chinese language classes.

See also
Golden Chersonese, another gold-related name for the region from the ancient Greeks, although it referred more specifically to the Malay Peninsula
Nanyang Communist Party
Nusantara
South China Sea
Southeast Asia
Bamboo Network

References

External links
Urban dimension of the political economy of Nanyang ethnicity
Art of Island Southeast Asia, a full text exhibition catalog from The Metropolitan Museum of Art

Chinese emigration
Geography of Southeast Asia
History of Southeast Asia
Foreign relations of China
Chinese exonyms
Historical Chinese exonyms
Historical regions